HLA complex group 22 is a protein that in humans is encoded by the HCG22 gene.

References

Further reading 

Genes
Human proteins